Star 107 may refer to a number of independent radio stations in the United Kingdom:

 Star Radio (Cambridge and Ely) in Cambridgeshire
 Star 107.2 in Bristol
 Star 107.5 in Cheltenham, Gloucestershire
 Star 107.7 in Weston-super-Mare, Somerset
 Star 107.9 in Stroud, Gloucestershire